Kentucky's 7th congressional district was a district of the United States House of Representatives in Kentucky.

It was eliminated in 1993 when reapportionment reduced Kentucky's House representation from seven seats to six. The eastern Kentucky region formerly in the 7th district is now largely in the 5th district. The last congressman to represent the 7th district was Chris Perkins, who succeeded his father, Carl D. Perkins.

List of members representing the district

References

 Congressional Biographical Directory of the United States 1774–present

07
Former congressional districts of the United States
1813 establishments in Kentucky
Constituencies established in 1813
Constituencies disestablished in 1933
1933 disestablishments in Kentucky
Constituencies established in 1935
1935 establishments in Kentucky
Constituencies disestablished in 1993
1993 disestablishments in Kentucky